Patricia Maria Spratlen-Etem (born March 14, 1956 in Columbus, Ohio) is an American former competitive rower. She rowed at the University of California, Berkeley.

Olympian
Spratlen qualified for the 1980 U.S. Olympic team but was unable to compete due to the 1980 Summer Olympics boycott. In 2007, she received one of 461 Congressional Gold Medals created especially for the spurned athletes. She was a member of the American women's coxed fours team that finished fourth at the 1984 Summer Olympics in Los Angeles.

Personal
Her son Emerson Etem is a professional ice hockey player.

References

1956 births
Living people
Sportspeople from Columbus, Ohio
American female rowers
Olympic rowers of the United States
Rowers at the 1984 Summer Olympics
Congressional Gold Medal recipients
21st-century American women